Elisha John Durbin (February 1, 1800) – March 22, 1887) was an American Roman Catholic priest, known as the "patriarch-priest of Kentucky".

Early life and education

Durbin was born in Madison County, Kentucky, the son of John Justin Durbin, a pioneer, and Patience Logsdon. In 1816, he was sent to the preparatory seminary of St. Thomas, in Nelson County, where he spent about four years of manual labour and study under missionaries including John Baptist Mary David, Benedict Joseph Flaget, Felix de Andreis, and Joseph Rosati. From there, he went to the nearby Seminary of St. Joseph, at Bardstown, where, in 1821 and 1822, he was taught by Francis Patrick Kenrick.

Career 
He was ordained priest in Bardstown, by coadjutor Bishop David on September 21, 1822. Thus began a missionary career of over 60 years as the "Apostle of Western Kentucky". Union County, Kentucky was the center of his mission. From it he journeyed on horseback over his vast territory, erected churches, established stations, formed congregations, and visited isolated families.

In the beginning, duty called him beyond his mission proper into Indiana, and once a year to Nashville, Tennessee. He traversed a sparsely settled mission incessantly. Occasionally, a cogent communication from him would appear in the press.

In 1884, he was assigned him the small mission at Princeton, Kentucky. Durbin suffered a stroke in 1885, which resulted in paralysis. He died in Shelbyville, Kentucky in 1887.

References

Attribution

Further reading
Donald R. Durbin, Jr. (2004), Patriarch of the American Frontier: The Life of Reverend Father Elisha John Durbin

1800 births
1887 deaths
Catholic Church in Kentucky
19th-century American Roman Catholic priests